The 2006 All-Ireland Senior Football Championship Final was the 119th All-Ireland Final and the deciding match of the 2006 All-Ireland Senior Football Championship, an inter-county Gaelic football tournament for the top teams in Ireland. 

Kerry won by 13 points, the widest winning margin in an All-Ireland final since 1978.

Mayo were hoping to bridge a gap that stretched all the way back to their All-Ireland football title winning team of 1951. They failed yet again, having lost to Kerry in 2004 and 1997, Meath in 1996 and Cork in 1989.

Mayo were 2–4 down with no score after 13 minutes, the Kerry total of 4–15 was the highest in a final since Dublin's 5–12 total against Armagh in the 1977 final; in 2022, Martin Breheny listed it among "five of the worst" All-Ireland SFC finals since 1972, commenting: "Kerry's awesome scoring power against a weak Mayo defence robbed the final of a competitive edge, the basic requirement to make a game entertaining".

References

All-Ireland Senior Football Championship Final
All-Ireland Senior Football Championship Final, 2006
All-Ireland Senior Football Championship Final
All-Ireland Senior Football Championship Finals
Kerry county football team matches
Mayo county football team matches